The Stone House of John Marsh is a historic stone house in Contra Costa County, California, built in 1855–56. It is now included in the newly-designated Marsh Creek State Park. It has not been officially opened to the public because of safety concerns, but restoration began in 2006 and is continuing as of October 2017.

History

John Marsh (1799–1856), a native of Massachusetts and graduate of Harvard University, had studied medicine for a year at Harvard before deciding to go west to seek his fortune. By the 1830s, he reached the Mexican province of Alta California (now the modern U.S. state of California), where he convinced the government authorities in Los Angeles that his undergraduate diploma certified that he was qualified to practice as a physician. For several years thereafter he was considered the only white doctor in the province. He soon became quite wealthy  and invested his earnings in land and cattle. After a few years, he moved north to the Bay Area, where he continued his practice. In 1838, he bought a large tract of land known as Rancho Los Méganos, some distance east of San Francisco in what is now East Contra Costa County. He settled in a four-room adobe house near Mount Diablo, and continued to expand his businesses.

In 1851, Marsh met and married Abby Tuck, a beautiful and adventurous young lady from Massachusetts, then living in San Francisco. She apparently was somewhat frail and suffered from seasickness on voyages. Her new husband realized that the adobe house, which had no modern conveniences and even had dirt floors, was unsuitable for his new wife. Their daughter, Abigail, was born in 1852, making the need for a better house even more urgent. He hired San Francisco architect Thomas Boyd to design a magnificent mansion for the family.

In 1853, Marsh soon began construction of a magnificent home built entirely of stone quarried from the nearby hills. The  Gothic-Revival style home incorporated a  tower and exterior porch supported by octagonal pillars. The entire cost of the home did not exceed $20,000. Abby died in 1855, however, before the Stone House was completed. Marsh ultimately moved into the new house about three weeks before he was murdered.

Marsh evidently had heavy debt obligations when he died. According to Craig, Los Méganos was sold to one Jack Williams, who was backed by the Sanford family of New York.  They rented the house to a series of tenant farmers and let the property fall into disrepair and decay. They were visited in May, 1862 by William Henry Brewer and the California Geological Survey. The ranch was bought by the Balfour-Guthrie Company. The Cowell Company subsequently acquired the house and land. By 1966, the HABS report described the property as a ""desolate wreck."

The mansion, undergoing stabilization since 2006, still stands as part of the Marsh Creek State Park, formerly known as Cowell Ranch/John Marsh Property State Historic Park, which is preparing to apply for status as a National Historic Monument. The park includes  of natural habitat. The mansion is on the list of National Historic Places, and funds are being sought for restoration. It is not open to the public, as of March 2017.

Description of Marsh House

The roof has four large dormers, so that the third story rooms are full height. The portico has a balcony at the second floor-level, which was supported by octagonal pillars. The balcony was decorated with balustrades, as can be seen easily in the 1870 photo shown here. Full-length French doors allowed access from the portico to each room on the first and second floors.

Inside the stone exterior, there was a  void, then another wall built of adobe brick. The architect chose to use an asymmetric Victorian floor plan, instead of the symmetrical Georgian style that was popular in most of the larger California houses built in the 1850s. The first floor contained a stair hall that ran from the front door to the rear door, a parlor, dining room, office and kitchen. The second level has the master bedroom located directly above the parlor and accesses to the top level of the portico. There are two other bedrooms and a bath on the second level that access the stair hall. Another stair leads to the third level, which contains three more rooms. A ladder leads from the third floor hall to the tower parapet.

The original tower was built entirely of stone and designed for defense against unwelcome visitors, because the area was considered "bandit country," with no organized law enforcement agency at the time. The top of the tower was crenellated, giving it a fortress-like appearance and providing some protection to the defenders. However, an earthquake in 1868, severely damaged the tower, and it needed to be mostly rebuilt. The rebuilt tower had a wood top that imitated the former castellated stone and the vertical wood surfaces covered with shingles. The shingles were painted about 1925.

The main interior partitions were masonry, other walls were wood studs with wood lath. The walls were then plastered. Ceilings were constructed of lath and plaster. The roof was framed and the exterior was originally covered with wood shingles (later replaced with asphalt shingles). During the 2006 reconstruction, inspections showed the roof so damaged and leaky from rot that was given a temporary cover of tin, as shown in the 2012 photo above.

Present status
In 1960, Henry Cowell, the last owner and operator of the ranch, donated the house to Contra Costa County, with the understanding that the house would be restored.

In 1979, ownership passed to the California State Parks Department.

The John Marsh House was listed on the National Register of Historic Places (NRHP) with Reference Number on October 7, 1981.

Neither Cowell, the county nor the state was able to come up with funding for even the essential restoration. In 2004, the John Marsh Historic Trust was organized to attract private donations for that purpose. Meanwhile, nature continued to damage the house. A large section of the south wall collapsed in the 1970s, as a result of an earthquake.

Among the major objectives for future restoration and reconstruction work are:
 Repairing the load-bearing interior walls, which will be retained;
 Rebuilding the portico;
 Rebuilding the top of the tower;
 Installing new roofing;
 Adding sandstone finishing to the south wall exterior.

Nearly one million dollars has been spent on stabilizing the house since 2006. This work was required to keep the sandstone structure from collapsing.  The unrestored house is now part of Marsh Creek State Park, which is not open to the public.

The state of California allocated $1.4 million for construction and restoration of the house as part of the state's 2021 - 2022 budget.

Notes

References

External links
NRHP Inventory and Nomination Form National Park Service – National Digital Asset System.

Houses completed in 1856
Pre-statehood history of California
History of Contra Costa County, California
Sandstone houses in the United States